Prachuap Football Club (Thai: สโมสรฟุตบอลประจวบ), also referred to as PT Prachuap Football Club (Thai: สโมสรฟุตบอลพีทีประจวบ) for sponsorship reasons, is a Thai professional football club based in Prachuap Khiri Khan Province, Thailand. The club was officially founded in 2009 and took around 2 years to set up. They currently play in the Thai League 1.

History
In their first season, 2009–2010, two years after the club formed, they entered and played in Regional League Division 2 Central & Eastern region. With a limitation of budget and environment, they finished in tenth position out of 12 teams. For the next season, the 2010–2011 campaign, they moved to the Southern division. When asked about the reason for the move, they cited insufficient budget and concerns about safety.

In the 2011–2012 season, the club targeted a return to join the league again after pulling out in the 2010–2011 season. The new chairman, Mr. Songkiat Lim-aroonrak, appointed and aimed to change the club philosophy for the next generation of success.  He considered re-designing the club with a new logo, stadium and appearance.

In season 2014–2015, the club won AIS League Division 2 – Southern Region and advanced through Champions League Round. They defeated Thai Honda in the final match and were crowned the title.

In season 2015–2016, the club began to play in Thai Division 1 League since the founding of the club in 2011. They finished mid-table, with good performance for their first season.

In season 2016–2017, the club changed the team name to "PT Prachuap" to reciprocate for the main sponsor, PTG Energy, which sponsored the club by strengthening the squad with 20 new players and a more experienced coaching staff.

Logo
 In 2007, the first official logo was designed under the concept of "Club home province famous". Prachuap Khiri Khan is famous in various aspects. They considered interpreting the Kui Buri elephant and Kuha Karuhas pavilion in their logo. Kui Buri is famous for rich forest with wild elephant habitat.  "Kuha Karuhas pavilion", One of Khao Sam Roi Yot National Park most visit point, located inside Phraya Nakhon Cave, it is a historic site built during King Rama V's (King Chulalongkorn) reign. The throne has since become the symbol of Prachuap Khiri Khan Province.
 In 2011–2012 season, the club targeted to re-design a new logo. "Wasps" was chosen as club characters and mascot. It was derived from the nickname of the Minister Chalermchai Sri-on, former MPs of Prachuap Khiri Khan Province, whom the president of the club respects very much.
 In 2018 season, the club changed its logo by using an orange-black color and add text PT into their logo.

Stadium

Sam Ao Stadium, former known as Prachuap Khiri Khan Province Stadium, is a multi-purpose stadium in Prachuap Khiri Khan Province, Thailand. It is currently used mostly for football matches and is the home stadium of Prachuap Football Club, The stadium holds 5,000 people.

Seasons by seasons record

[A] In 2010, the club withdrew from league citing by insufficient budget and safety concerned after force moving to play in Southern Region, before the 2010-season commenced.

[B] On 5 August 2020, Football Association of Thailand decided to cancel the 2020 League Cup due to COVID-19 pandemic and main sponsor Toyota cancellation of support for the League Cup tournament with the reason of economic impact.

P = Played
W = Games won
D = Games drawn
L = Games lost
F = Goals for
A = Goals against
Pts = Points
Pos = Final position
N/A = No answer

DIV 1 = Yamaha League 1
TPL = Thai Premier League
T1 = Thai League 1
T2 = Thai League 2

QR1 = First Qualifying Round
QR2 = Second Qualifying Round
QR3 = Third Qualifying Round
QR4 = Fourth Qualifying Round
RInt = Intermediate Round
R1 = Round 1
R2 = Round 2
R3 = Round 3

R4 = Round 4
R5 = Round 5
R6 = Round 6
GR = Group stage
QF = Quarter-finals
SF = Semi-finals
RU = Runners-up
S = Shared
W = Winners

Players

Current squad

Out on loan

Club officials

Honours

Domestic leagues
Thai League 2
 Third place : 2017
Regional League Division 2:
 Winner: 2014
Regional League Southern Division
 Winners : 2014
Regional League Central-West Division
 Runner-up : 2013

Cups
 League Cup
 Winners (1) : 2019

Affiliated clubs 
  Buriram United
  Grand Andaman Ranong United

References
 http://www.siamdara.com/Variety/150110_0752.html
 OFFICIAL : ประจวบเปิดตัว ธวัชชัย คุมทัพลุย ด.1
  ประจวบเปิดตัว 2 แข้งใหม่จากปราสาทสายฟ้า

External links 
 Official Website of Prachuap FC
 Official Facebook page of Prachuap FC
 ทีมนี้ต้องตาม!! พีที ประจวบ เอฟซี : "ต่อพิฆาต" รอผงาดขึ้นไทยลีก

 
Association football clubs established in 2009
Football clubs in Thailand
Prachuap Khiri Khan province
2009 establishments in Thailand